Nancy Baker Cahill (born 1970) is an American new media artist based in Los Angeles, California. She works in augmented reality (AR) and virtual reality (VR), drawing and video, among other media. Her work often merges technology and public art, examining notions of the human, the body in relation to systems of power, issues involving art and access, and perception.

Education and career
Baker Cahill was born in Cambridge, Massachusetts and grew up in Boston. She received a BA in art from Williams College in 1992. After working at a Boston television station, and later moving to Los Angeles with her family, she began her art career in 2007.

Baker Cahill has exhibited extended reality works at the site-specific 2019 Desert X Biennial, Hammer Museum, Francisco Carolinum (Linz) and Kunsthalle Zürich, and as part of the public  projects Sunset Digital Billboards (2018) and "Luminex: Dialogues of Light" (2021), a walkable digital art exhibition projection mapped onto downtown Los Angeles buildings. She has had featured exhibitions at the Pasadena Museum of California Art, Los Angeles Contemporary Exhibitions (LACE), Boston Cyberarts and the LUMA Foundation Elevation 1049 Biennial in Switzerland.

In 2018, Baker Cahill created 4th Wall, a free AR application with developer Drive Studios. 4th Wall provides a platform through which artists can exhibit virtual works to a wider audience, including the ability to intervene in specific, outdoor public spaces through a geo-location feature. She and other artists have used the application as a tool of public engagement and critical social practice, mounting public art exhibitions in AR at sites of cultural, historical and political significance.

Work
Baker Cahill's early work centered on works on paper and videos that explored physical embodiment in an increasingly immersive manner. In the latter 2010s, she began creating 3D digital iterations of abstract drawings that suggested organic forms or forces in motion. In her later extended reality works, she often digitally transforms hand-drawn works on paper into sculptural, hybrid objects and moving animations that can be reinserted into the world as videos, prints, or illuminated projections.

Analog work
Throughout Baker Cahill's career, drawing has been a foundational practice, extending across two- and three-dimensional, as well as VR and AR mediums. She initially worked semi-representationally, but turned to abstraction in 2010 with graphite, gouache and video depictions of undulating, biomorphic forms set against velvety expanses. Critics described these works as visceral, sometimes unsettling, Rorschach-like viewing experiences that suggested technology-aided explorations into the unseen depths of the body. In various series, she experimented with drawings that transitioned into three-dimensional space, by shooting them with bullets, puncturing them with a leather puncher or collaging shrapnel-like slivers onto them.

In the latter 2010s, she sought to create more immersive experiences in her "Surds," "Manifestos" and "Hollowpoint" series, which resembled twisting bodily forms or swirling storms, falling comets and teeming undergrowth. In 2017, she turned to virtual reality (and later, augmented reality), mark-making in the air with a handheld controller to create 3D digital iterations captured by laser of her "Hollowpoint" graphite drawings. Her later projects continue to include both analog and digital components.

Extended reality (XR) projects
Baker Cahill's initial extended reality projects were created in virtual reality. These included her VR "Hollowpoint" drawings (exhibited at LACE, 2018, among other venues) and her works for the Sunset Digital Billboards project (2018), which depicted abstract towers of translucent color and jagged edges of metallic shards floating through space. Seeking to offer wider access to her work than VR (which requires expensive equipment) could, she subsequently shifted to augmented reality after creating the free 4th Wall application.

In several large-scale, site-responsive (appearing differently based on times and conditions) AR projects, Baker Cahill addressed environmental devastation and accountability. Elvira Wilk of Frieze described these works—ephemeral, mutable and relocatable—as "a distinct counterpoint to (masculinist) land art traditions that exalt human intervention into the natural landscape." Her Desert X works, Revolutions and Margin of Error (2019), placed bursting, animated drawings—of fuchsia, gold and orange desert blooms or abstract, organic  forms—above a Palm Springs wind farm and the Salton Sea, respectively, spatially and conceptually tying together sites of renewable energy with the casualties of environmental disruption and degradation. Los Angeles Times critic Christopher Knight described the latter work as a haunting, "twirling, swirling fog of phantasmagorical shards of light and shadow hovering in the sky" and evoking, among other things, a star being born from a cloud of dust, a plague of locusts, or a thought forming. 

 
Baker Cahill exhibited the AR work Mushroom Cloud in site-responsive iterations at Art Basel Miami (2021), the Santa Monica Pier, and the immersive competition of the Tribeca Film Festival (both 2022). In its first two versions, a fiery, cataclysmic mushroom cloud swells and explodes over the ocean before transforming into a crackling web of lacy, lilac arterial threads—more hopeful forms of interconnectedness suggesting digital webs and mycelia (fungal networks that break down organic matter and redirect nutrients back into ecosystems).

On July 4, 2020, Baker Cahill presented Liberty Bell, a public AR installation commissioned by Art Production Fund. It consisted of six site-specific animated artworks set in culturally significant locations across the Eastern United States: the site of the Boston Tea Party revolt; the Washington Monument; the "Rocky Steps" in Philadelphia; the Fort Tilden Army installation in Rockaway, Queens; Fort Sumter in Charleston; and the Edmund Pettus Bridge in Selma, site of the 1965 "Bloody Sunday" attack. The one-and-a-half-minute animation depicted a floating, shape-shifting coil of red, white, and blue brushstrokes roughly approximating a swaying, abstracted Liberty Bell—accompanied by a raucous soundtrack—which built toward arrhythmic dissolution but retained cohesion. Artillery wrote that the "writhing, seething mess of threads" and tolling bell "embodies the turbulent political discourse of an election year and the fraying state of American democracy." Smithsonian Magazine described the work as a timely reflection on liberty, freedom and injustice, writing, "Liberty Bell debuts at a unique point in American history, when communities are reckoning with the racist legacies of historical monuments across the country and, in many cases, taking them down."

In 2021, Baker Cahill began working with non-fungible tokens (NFTs) and blockchain technology, as in the work Slipstream 001 (2021), for which she used torn graphite paper to create a sculpture that was transmuted into a 3D object and filmed so that it moved in a slow semi-circle before viewers. Charlotte Kent of The Brooklyn Rail described the multi-layered piece as a "simple yet disconcerting breakdown and reconfiguration of a 'real' sculpture." Baker Cahill collaboratively developed Contract Killers—an NFT project critiquing smart contracts, accountability and the yet-unrealized promise of equity in the blockchain space—with art lawyer Sarah Conley Odenkirk, Contemporary Art Museum of Houston, and Snark.art. It consisted of four separate AR renderings of a handshake dissipating into a swirl of pixels in front of selected charged environments (e.g., Los Angeles City Hall, the Hall of Justice) in order to represent a state of failed social trust and obligation. In order to address the typical energy impacts of NFTs, Baker Cahill used the more environmentally friendly proof-of-stake (PoS) blockchain (rather than proof-of-work) for the project. New media art curator and historian Christiane Paul wrote, "By minting them as NFTs, [Baker Cahill] positions the smart contract among other kinds of contracts—social, judicial, financial—and highlights the instability of all of them."

Curatorial and collaborative projects
Many of Baker Cahill's collaborative projects have examined social issues, often through the use of 4th Wall to virtually locate works at contested sites, enabling critical commentary while skirting issues of permission. In 2018, she initiated "Coordinates," an ongoing series of curated, global AR public exhibitions that were strategically situated to address topical issues such as the Breonna Taylor tragedy. "Defining Line" was an extension of that project—a show she co-curated with artist Debra Scacco of eight immersive AR and VR artworks that activated untold sites of historical significance along the Los Angeles River; its works examined urban redevelopment, the environment, Native histories and patterns of gentrification. In 2019, Baker Cahill co-curated "Battlegrounds" with Jesse Damiani, an exhibition of 31 AR works that sought to reclaim various locations in and around New Orleans, including a sugarcane plantation, gentrified neighborhoods, prisons, polluted waterways and confederate statues. 

In 2020, "In Plain Sight," a project organized by artists Cassils and Rafa Esparza involving real and AR skywriting located over U.S. detention centers from 80 different artists, used the 4th Wall application.

Recognition
In 2022, Baker Cahill received a Los Angeles County Museum of Art (LACMA) Art + Technology Lab Grant and a COLA (City of Los Angeles) Master Artist Fellowship. She was an artist fellow at the Occidental College Oxy Arts' Encoding Futures program (2021), a Williams College Bicentennial Medal of Honor recipient (2021), and one of ten Berggruen Institute inaugural artist fellows in its Transformations of the Human program (2020). In 2012, she received an ARC Grant from the Center for Cultural Innovation. She was a featured TEDx speaker in 2018 and a keynote speaker at Games for Change in New York City in 2019.

References 

1970 births
21st-century American artists
21st-century American women artists
Artists from Cambridge, Massachusetts
American social justice activists
Artists from Los Angeles
Augmented reality
Living people
Political artists
Virtual reality
Williams College alumni